Tamara Zidanšek was the two-time defending champion, having won the last edition in 2019, however she was unable to defend her title as she was still competing at the 2021 French Open, reaching the semi-final of the Grand Slam.

Jasmine Paolini won the title, defeating Arantxa Rus in the final, 6–2, 7–6(7–4).

Seeds

Draw

Finals

Top half

Bottom half

Qualifying

Seeds

Qualifiers

Draw

First qualifier

Second qualifier

Third qualifier

Fourth qualifier

References

External Links
Main Draw
Qualifying Draw

Bol Open - Singles
2021 Singles